Cadmium zinc telluride, (CdZnTe) or CZT, is a compound of cadmium, zinc and tellurium or, more strictly speaking, an alloy of cadmium telluride and zinc telluride. A  direct bandgap semiconductor, it is used in a variety of applications, including semiconductor radiation detectors, photorefractive gratings, electro-optic modulators, solar cells, and terahertz generation and detection.  The band gap varies from approximately 1.4 to 2.2 eV, depending on composition.

Radiation detectors using CZT can operate in direct-conversion (or photoconductive) mode at room temperature, unlike some other materials (particularly germanium) which require cooling. Their relative advantages include high sensitivity for X-rays and gamma rays, due to the high atomic numbers of Cd and Te, and better energy resolution than scintillator detectors.  CZT can be formed into different shapes for different radiation-detecting applications, and a variety of electrode geometries, such as coplanar grids  and small pixel detectors, have been developed to provide unipolar (electron-only) operation, thereby improving energy resolution. A 1 cm3 CZT crystal has a sensitivity range of 30 keV to 3 MeV with a 2.5% FWHM energy resolution at 662 keV. Pixelated CZT with a volume of 6 cm3 can achieve 0.71% FWHM energy resolution at 662 keV and perform Compton imaging.

References

External links
 National Pollutant Inventory - Cadmium and compounds

Cadmium compounds
Zinc compounds
Tellurides
II-VI semiconductors
Nonlinear optical materials
Terahertz technology
Electro-optical materials